R702 road may refer to:

 R702 road (Ireland)
 R702 road (South Africa)